Namakkal Kavignar Ramaligam Government Arts College for Women, is a women's general degree college located in Namakkal, Tamil Nadu, in India. It was established in the year 1969. The college is affiliated with Periyar University. This college offers different courses in arts, commerce and science.

Faculty

Departments

Science
Physics
Chemistry
Mathematics
Nutrition & Dietics
Botany
Zoology
Computer Science

Arts and Commerce
Tamil
English
History
Economics
Business Administration
Commerce

Accreditation
The college is  recognized by the University Grants Commission (UGC).

References

External links

Educational institutions established in 1969
1969 establishments in Tamil Nadu
Colleges affiliated to Periyar University
Namakkal
Women's universities and colleges in Tamil Nadu